Mohamed Mohamud Ibrahim (born in 1946 or 1947) is a Somali politician.

Biography
From 2008 to 2011, Ibrahim lived in the Harlesden area of London in the United Kingdom, where he worked as an English support teacher at the Newman Catholic College.

Since August 2011, he has served as Deputy Prime Minister and Minister of Foreign Affairs of Somalia, under incumbent Premier Abdiweli Mohamed Ali and Foreign Minister Mohamed Abdullahi Omaar.

References

Somalian expatriates in the United Kingdom
Living people
1940s births
Government ministers of Somalia